in Japanese folklore are mind-reading monkey-like monsters ("yōkai") said to dwell within the mountains of Hida and Mino (presently Gifu Prefecture).

Mythology
People are said to meet them while walking along mountain paths or resting in the mountains. Upon reading a person's mind, the satori would say the person's thoughts aloud faster than a human could. There is also a theory that they are the child incarnations of mountain gods who have come to ruin and turned into a yōkai form.

They would appear before people at mountain huts, and are even said to try to eat and kill if they have a chance, but if something unexpectedly strikes the satori, they become stricken with fear and run away. There is also a theory that they do not present any danger to people and would not dare to harm those who work on the mountain, allowing people to coexist with satori.

A satori is depicted in Toriyama Sekien's Konjaku Gazu Zoku Hyakki, but since this was modeled after the yamako (玃) in the Wakan Sansai Zue and other works, and since it even said, "there are yamako (玃) deep in the mountains of Hida and Mino" in the text along with it, it is said that Toriyama Sekien gave it the name "satori" since they are able to read (satoru) people's minds. The yamako was an ape man from Chinese legends, but in the Wakan Sansai Zue, it was an animal that read people's minds in Hida and Mino, and since the character 玃 can also be pronounced "kaku", the character 覚 (also "kaku") was used as one that fit for a replacement, which was later misread as "satori", so there is the interpretation that this is what gave birth to the legend of "satori" as a different kind of yokai than the yamako. There is also the theory that satori are based on the yamabiko found in the Konjaku Gazu Zoku Hyakki and the Hyakkai Zukan and other collections, but according to the folklorist Kunio Yanagita, from his work "Yokai Dangi", the folklore that satori would read people's minds, and the legend that yamabiko would imitate people's voices have the same origin.

Cultural impact
The Komeiji sisters of Touhou Project are both based on the myth of the satori, albeit with one of them no longer being able to read minds.
In Kamen Rider Hibiki, a Makamou has the same name as this yōkai and is introduced as one of the final villains of the last episode of the TV series, albeit it does not feature a monkey.

See also
 Bigfoot
 Hibagon
 Yozakura Quartet

References

Yōkai